Untitled, more commonly referred to as The Blue Lady, 1999–2002, is a carved teakwood, metal, and indigo sculpture by Mumbai-based artist Navjot Altaf. The artwork represents a goddess of fertility and is painted bright blue, a traditional Hindu colour symbolizing divinity. The larger than life sculpture is also an illustration of the "challenges faced by women who try to claim recognition for their knowledge in parts of India." This contemporary South Asian work can be seen in the  Sir Christopher Ondaatje South Asian Gallery of The Royal Ontario Museum in Toronto, Ontario, Canada. Notably, the sculpture is listed as one of the ROM's iconic treasures and has been considered to be one of the most important pieces in the museum's collection of South Asian art.

In 2003, (Untitled) The Blue Lady was exhibited at Talwar Gallery in New York City, which currently represents Altaf, in her first solo exhibition in the United States entitled In Response To.... The sculpture was installed alongside other human figures, similar in their monumental scale and brilliant indigo color, in what was an almost theatre-like setting; together, the solid, confident female figures became iconic presences, whose insistent physicality worked to "subvert...the narrative of patriarchal dominance and transcending the modes of art practices." The exhibition was instrumental in illuminating the gender-based concerns of Altaf's work, which questions the accepted language of eroticism, sexuality, and domesticity through the creation of figures, like (Untitled) The Blue Lady, of anomalous femininity.

Description 
The sculpture explores contrasting ideas in South Asian culture while providing a contemporary take on traditional South Asian art. The wood from which the statue is crafted, along with the indigo blue colour that it is painted, are symbolic nods to the handicraft industries of South Asia. The buxom female form is also seen readily in historical South Asian arts. Through the combination of the handcrafted and industrial, the past and present are brought together and contrasted without a recognizable resolution.

Among the influences cited for this sculpture are, "village witch-trials, fertility goddesses, and the indigo trade." The sculpture is also referred to as "Kunti", after a woman in the Adivasi community in Bastar, India that was part of Altaf's inspiration for the artwork.  In this case, the woman was declared a witch and put on display to be humiliated in public. Altaf describes this real-life woman, Kunti, as a normal, confident woman, who was dehumanized for possessing knowledge.

Altaf started off by drawing the figure, then used clay to model it. The final sculpture, based on the clay model, is carved out of teakwood. Since it was not possible to carve the entire sculpture from one piece of wood, Altaf carved the torso and head as one piece, while the arms and legs have been carved separately. The body of the sculpture is not clothed, but bare. Her hands are stretched in mudra; one fist clenched, thumb outside fist, and the other hand open.  This symbolizes that she has knowledge in the grasped hand, and has the ability to receive more, while also dispersing information with the other open hand. The Blue Lady sits atop a vintage bottle drying rack; the inspiration for which Altaf drew from artist Marcel Duchamp's readymades, specifically his first readymade, the bottle drying rack.

References

External links 
 Talwar Gallery, Navjot Altaf: In Response To...

Collections of the Royal Ontario Museum
Indian contemporary art
Sculptures of women